Gli Undici moschettieri is a 1952 Italian documentary film directed by  Ennio De Concini and Fausto Saraceni..

Cast
 Silvio Piola: himself
 Giuseppe Meazza: himself
 Vittorio Pozzo: himself
 Fulvio Bernardini: himself
 Renzo De Vecchi: himself

External links 
 

1952 films
1950s Italian-language films
Italian documentary films
1952 documentary films
Italian black-and-white films
1950s Italian films